This is an alphabetical list of the songs known to have been written or co-written by Walter Afanasieff.

Notes

References

Afanasieff